The Mellieħa Ridge is a geographical ridge in northwestern Malta. A small part of the Victoria lines also go through the higher part of the ridge.

References

Ridges in Malta
Mellieħa